Fred Hoos (8 December 1953 in Maracaibo, Venezuela – 25 December 1983) was a Canadian field hockey player.

Fred Hoos was a member of the silver medal winning teams at the 1975 and 1979 Pan American Games as well as of the gold medal winning team at the 1983 Pan American Games. 
He also competed in the 1976 Summer Olympics.

Soon after winning the gold medal, Fred Hoos died from cancer at the age of 30.

References

External links
 

1953 births
1983 deaths
Sportspeople from Maracaibo
Canadian male field hockey players
Olympic field hockey players of Canada
Field hockey players at the 1976 Summer Olympics
Pan American Games medalists in field hockey
Pan American Games gold medalists for Canada
Pan American Games silver medalists for Canada
Field hockey players at the 1975 Pan American Games
Field hockey players at the 1979 Pan American Games
Field hockey players at the 1983 Pan American Games
Medalists at the 1975 Pan American Games
Medalists at the 1979 Pan American Games
Medalists at the 1983 Pan American Games